Film noir is not a clearly defined genre (see here for details on the characteristics). Therefore, the composition of this list may be controversial. To minimize dispute the films included here should preferably feature a footnote linking to a reliable, published source which states that the mentioned film is considered to be a film noir by an expert in this field, e.g.

The terms which are used below to subsume various periods and variations of film noir are not definitive and are meant as a navigational aid rather than as critical argument. Because the 1940s and 1950s are universally regarded as the "classic period" of American film noir, films released prior to 1940 are listed under the caption "Precursors / early noir-like films". Films released after 1959 should generally only be listed in the list of neo-noir titles.

Precursors / early noir-like films
Under Cover Man

1927
 Underworld

1928
 The Racket

1929
 Thunderbolt

1931
 The Big Gamble
 City Streets
 Little Caesar
 The Maltese Falcon (a.k.a. Dangerous Female)
 The Public Enemy
 Quick Millions
 The Secret Six

1932
 20,000 Years in Sing Sing
 The Beast of the City
 I Am a Fugitive from a Chain Gang
 Payment Deferred
 Scarface
 Two Seconds

1933
 Advice to the Lovelorn
 Blood Money
 Private Detective 62

1934
 Crime Without Passion
 Journal of a Crime
 Midnight
 The Thin Man

1935
 Bordertown
 Crime and Punishment
 G Men
 The Glass Key
 The Scoundrel

1936
 Bullets or Ballots
 Fury
 The Petrified Forest
 Satan Met a Lady

1937
 Dead End
 Marked Woman
 You Only Live Once

1938
 Angels with Dirty Faces
 You and Me

1939
 Blind Alley
 Each Dawn I Die
 King of the Underworld
 Let Us Live
 Rio
 The Roaring Twenties
 They Made Me a Criminal

1940
 Angels Over Broadway
 City for Conquest
 Johnny Apollo

Non-American
 La Chienne (1931, France)
 M (1931, Germany)
 Das Testament des Dr. Mabuse (The Testament of Dr. Mabuse) (1933, Germany)
 La Bandera (Escape from Yesterday) (1935, France)
 The Green Cockatoo (1937, United Kingdom)
 Pépé le Moko (1937, France)
 La Bête Humaine (The Human Beast) (1938, France)
 Hôtel du Nord (1938, France)
 Le Quai des brumes (Port of Shadows) (1938, France)
 They Drive by Night (1938, United Kingdom)
 Le Dernier tournant (The Last Turning) (1939, France)
 Le Jour se lève (Daybreak) (1939, France)
 On the Night of the Fire (a.k.a. The Fugitive) (1939, United Kingdom)
 Pièges (Personal Column) (1939, France)

Classic American noir

1940

1941

1942

1943

1944

1945

1946

1947

1948

1949

1950

1951

1952

1953

1954

1955

1956

1957

1958

1959

American color noir

British noir

1939
 Dead Men are Dangerous (a.k.a. Dangerous Masquerade)

1942
 The Night Has Eyes (a.k.a. Terror House)

1945
 Dead of Night
 Great Day
 Murder in Reverse?
 Pink String and Sealing Wax
 The Seventh Veil
 Waterloo Road

1946
 Appointment with Crime
 Wanted for Murder

1947
 Brighton Rock
 The Brothers
 Dancing with Crime
 Dear Murderer
 Frieda
 It Always Rains on Sunday
 Mine Own Executioner
 Night Beat
 The October Man
 Odd Man Out
 Take My Life
 Temptation Harbour
 They Made Me a Fugitive (a.k.a. I Became a Criminal)
 The Upturned Glass

1948
 Blanche Fury
 Daybreak
 Escape
 The Fallen Idol
 Good-Time Girl
 No Orchids for Miss Blandish (a.k.a. Black Dice)
 Noose (a.k.a. The Silk Noose)
 The Small Voice (a.k.a. The Hideout)
 So Evil My Love
 Uneasy Terms

1949
 Boys in Brown
 Conspirator
 Forbidden (a.k.a. Scarlet Heaven)
 The Interrupted Journey
 Obsession (a.k.a. The Hidden Room)
 Silent Dust
 The Small Back Room
 The Spider and the Fly
 The Third Man

1950
 The Blue Lamp
 The Clouded Yellow
 So Long at the Fair (a.k.a. The Black Curse)
 The Woman in Question (a.k.a. Five Angles on Murder)

1951
 Another Man's Poison
 I'll Get You for This (a.k.a. Lucky Nick Cain)
 The Long Dark Hall
 Pool of London
 There Is Another Sun (a.k.a. Wall of Death)

1952
 The Gambler and the Lady
 The Last Page (a.k.a. Man Bait)
 The Lost Hours (a.k.a. The Big Frame)
 Stolen Face
 Wide Boy
 Wings of Danger (a.k.a. Dead on Course)
 Women of Twilight (a.k.a. Twilight Women)

1953
 36 Hours (a.k.a. Terror Street)
 Black 13
 Cosh Boy (a.k.a. The Slasher)
 Deadly Nightshade
 The Flanagan Boy (a.k.a. Bad Blonde)
 The Intruder
 The Limping Man
 The Long Memory
 The Man Between
 Mantrap (a.k.a. Man in Hiding)
 Marilyn (a.k.a. Roadhouse Girl)
 Street of Shadows (a.k.a. Shadow Man)
 Three Steps to the Gallows (a.k.a. White Fire)

1954
 Before I Wake (a.k.a. Shadow of Fear)
 Face the Music (a.k.a. The Black Glove)
 Five Days (a.k.a. Paid to Kill)
 The Good Die Young
 The House Across the Lake (a.k.a. Heat Wave)
 Impulse
 Murder by Proxy (a.k.a. Blackout)
 The Sleeping Tiger
 A Stranger Came Home (a.k.a. The Unholy Four)
 Third Party Risk (a.k.a. Deadly Game)
 The Weak and the Wicked (a.k.a. Young and Willing)

1955
 The Brain Machine
 Cast a Dark Shadow
 Confession (a.k.a. The Deadliest Sin)
 Dial 999 (a.k.a. The Way Out)
 Joe MacBeth
 Little Red Monkey (a.k.a. Case of the Red Monkey)
 The Ship That Died of Shame (a.k.a. PT Raiders)

1956
 Soho Incident  (a.k.a. Spin a Dark Web)
 Tiger in the Smoke
 Wicked As They Come (a.k.a. Portrait in Smoke)
 Yield to the Night (a.k.a. Blonde Sinner)

1957
 Across the Bridge
 The Big Chance
 The Counterfeit Plan
 Hell Drivers
 Kill Her Gently
 Kill Me Tomorrow
 The Long Haul
 Man in the Shadow (a.k.a. Violent Stranger)
 Time Without Pity

1958
 Chase a Crooked Shadow
 Nowhere to Go
 Tread Softly Stranger

1959
 Blind Date (a.k.a. Chance Meeting)

1960
 Danger Tomorrow

1961
 The Frightened City

International noir
{{columns-list|colwidth=22em|
 Le Corbeau (The Raven) (1943, France)
 Ossessione (Obsession) (1943, Italy)
 Die Mörder sind unter uns (Murderers Among Us) (1946, East Germany)
 Les Portes de la nuit (Gates of the Night) (1946, France)
 Panic (Panique)  (1946, France)
 Quai des Orfèvres (Jenny Lamour) (1947, France)
 Dédée d'Anvers (Woman of Antwerp) (1948, France)
 Drunken Angel (1948, Japan)
 Stray Dog (1949, Japan)
 Une si jolie petite plage (Riptide) (1949, France)
 Aventurera (1950, Mexico)
 Gunman in the Streets (1950, France)
 Manèges (The Cheat) (1950, France)
 Los Olvidados (The Young and the Damned) (1950, Mexico)
 Der Verlorene (The Lost One) (1951, West Germany)
 Imbarco a mezzanotte (Stranger on the Prowl) (1952, Italy)
 La môme vert-de-gris (Poison Ivy) (1953, France)
 Abenteuer in Wien (Adventure in Vienna) (1953, Austria)
 Stolen Identity (1953, Austria) Razzia sur la chnouf (Razzia) (1954, France)
 Touchez pas au grisbi (Grisbi) (1954, France)
 Bob le flambeur (Bob the Gambler) (1955, France)
 Les Diaboliques (Diabolique) (1955, France) - horror noir 
 Mr. Arkadin (a.k.a. Confidential Report) (1955, France, Spain, Switzerland)
 Angela (1955, Italy)
 Du rififi chez les hommes (Rififi) (1955, France)
 Voici le temps des assassins (Deadlier Than the Male) (1956, France)
 Nachts, wenn der Teufel kam (1957, West Germany)
 Retour de manivelle (There's Always a Price Tag) (1957, France)
 Le rouge est mis (Speaking of Murder)  (1957, France)
 Ascenseur pour l'échafaud (Elevator to the Gallows) (1958, France)
 Le désordre et la nuit (Night Affair) (1958, France) (Back to the Wall a.k.a. Evidence in Concrete) (1958, France)
}}

Classic-period crossover films

Noir Westerns

Miscellaneous crossover films

Noir comedies / parodies

See also
List of neo-noir titles
Film gris
Golden Age of American animation

References

External links
 Most Popular Film-Noir Feature Films at IMDb
 An A-Z list of "classic noir titles" at IMDb
 Listings of Noir Films at www.theyshootpictures.com Comprehensive list of Film Noir movies at www.kingofthepeds.com''

 •

Films noir
Films noir